AUR, or aur, may refer to:

 Acute urinary retention
 African Union of Railways
 Alliance for Romanian Unity
 Alliance for the Union of Romanians
 American University of Rome
 Arch  User Repository
 Aur Atoll, Marshall Islands
 Auriga constellation abbreviation, as standardized by the International Astronomical Union
 Aur Island, Malaysia
 AUR, the IATA code for A. A. Bere Tallo Airport in East Nusa Tenggara, Indonesia
 AUR, the National Rail code for Aberdour railway station in Scotland, UK

See also